The Antelope Valley is a high valley in the eastern Sierra Nevada stretching from Mono County, California to Douglas County, Nevada.

Geography
The topography of the valley floor is gently rolling and conducive to the agricultural and pastoral uses to which it is put. The valley sides are made up of steep slopes. The primary land use is irrigation-based agriculture and grazing.

Hydrography
Antelope Valley is watered by the West Walker River and Mill Creak, and contains Topaz Lake (a reservoir).

Settlement
On the California side of the border, where the vast majority of the valley lies, the Antelope Valley is served by the Antelope Valley Fire Protection District (formed 1947) and the Antelope Valley Water District (formed 1961), and includes the communities of Coleville, Topaz, and Walker.

The 2000 census reported that the population of the portion of Antelope Valley in California was 1,525. In 2003, the California Department of Finance estimated that the population was 1,557.

Transportation
U.S. Route 395 traverses the valley and is its primary thoroughfare.

See also
Antelope Valley (Elko-White Pine Counties), Nevada
Antelope Valley (Eureka County), Nevada
Antelope Valley (Lander County), Nevada

References

Valleys of California
Valleys of Nevada
Landforms of the Sierra Nevada (United States)
Landforms of Douglas County, Nevada
Valleys of Mono County, California